The Battle of Arkansas Post, also known as Battle of Fort Hindman, was fought from January 9 to 11, 1863, near the mouth of the Arkansas River at Arkansas Post, Arkansas, as part of the Vicksburg Campaign of the American Civil War. Confederate forces had constructed a fort known as Fort Hindman near Arkansas Post in late 1862. In December of that year, a Union force under the command of Major-General William T. Sherman left for an expedition against Vicksburg, without Major-General John A. McClernand because neither Major-Generals Henry Halleck nor Ulysses S. Grant trusted McClernand. After Sherman's force was repulsed at Chickasaw Bayou, McClernand arrived and took command from Sherman in January 1863.

McClernand led an expedition to capture Arkansas Post, despite disapproval from Grant. After arriving near the fort on January 9, Union infantry moved into position on January 10. A major Union naval bombardment of the Confederate fort occurred that evening. Early in the afternoon of January 11, McClernand ordered an infantry assault, which moved close to the Confederate fortifications. Having suffered through severe artillery fire, white flags of surrender began to appear above the Confederate positions around 4 or 4:30 p.m., although the garrison commander, Confederate Brigadier-General Thomas J. Churchill denied ordering the surrender. There was some confusion as the surrender occurred anyway, as one of his brigade commanders initially refused to capitulate. Grant was convinced as to the value of the movement against Arkansas Post after the fact, but reassigned McClernand to corps command.

Background

With Confederate defenses on the Arkansas and the White rivers being minimal, Colonel John W. Dunnington was appointed commander of river defenses within the state on September 28, 1862. Dunnington selected a location for a fortification on the Arkansas River near the settlement of Arkansas Post. 
The columbiads were originally from the ram CSS Pontchartrain. Three buildings, two magazines, and a well were located in the fort. On December 10, Brigadier-General Thomas J. Churchill was appointed to command the post.

Meanwhile, in the state of Mississippi, Grant was moving down the Mississippi Central Railroad with 40,000 men in an attempt to capture the city of Vicksburg, Mississippi that had begun on November 26.  On December 5, Halleck suggested a naval operation down the Mississippi River against Vicksburg, using a portion of Grant's force.  A naval operation against Vicksburg had been planned since November by McClernand, who believed he would have full command of such a movement.  However, Halleck, who distrusted McClernand, used language in the official orders the latter had received to undercut him: McClernand could only use troops not required by Grant.  Grant, who had a rocky relationship with McClernand, tabbed Sherman to lead Halleck's proposed maneuver downriver.  After Sherman reached Memphis, to prepare for the movement, Halleck informed Grant that President Abraham Lincoln wanted McClernand to command the naval movement. Grant, in turn, knowing that Sherman was expected to begin the expedition in a matter of days, sent McClernand a letter (intentionally eschewing faster telegraph service) offering him a position under his command.

Acting Rear-Admiral David D. Porter was in command of the Union Navy portion of the riverine movement towards Vicksburg.  Sherman's men left Memphis on December 20. McClernand was still in Illinois and the movement he had intended to command left without him. The same day that Sherman left, Confederate cavalry raids destroyed Grant's supply lines, and he was forced to retreat.  Sherman's operation, which contained over 30,000 men, reached the Vicksburg area on Christmas Eve, and sailed up the Yazoo River. After landing on December 26 and 27, the Union soldiers made a frontal attack against Confederate defenses at Chickasaw Bayou on December 29, but were repulsed with heavy losses. Defeated, Sherman's men re-boarded their ships on January 1, 1863, and withdrew from the battlefield.

Preparations

When Sherman reached the Mississippi from the Yazoo, he met McClernand, who was upset about being sidestepped in command of the river expedition.  After a discussion between the two officers, McClernand took command of the force, naming it the Army of the Mississippi, with Sherman becoming a subordinate commander in the army.  Sherman did not approve of McClernand's appointment to command and in a letter to his wife stated that Lincoln "will get his fill before he is done".  In late December, Confederate troops had captured a Union supply steamer, Blue Wing, and sent it back to Arkansas Post.  Sherman heard of the raid, and believed that more raids from the position at Arkansas Post were likely.  Viewing Arkansas Post as a threat and believing that a victory would restore his men's broken morale, Sherman began planning a movement against the Confederate position.  Separately, McClernand had also decided on a movement on Arkansas Post.  On the night of January 3/4, the two officers went to speak with Porter about using his naval vessels in the movement. Porter disliked McClernand and his treatment of Sherman, but agreed to the movement for Sherman.  Writing about Sherman's support for the plan, Richard L. Kiper wrote that his motives were "somewhat suspect" and likely based on desiring a victory to restore the damage his reputation had taken from Chickasaw Bayou.

During this time, McClernand believed that he was an army commander, while he really only held a corps command under Grant.  Accordingly, on the morning of January 4, McClernand organized his command into the 13th and 15th Army Corps. Sherman commanded the latter, while the former was under Brigadier-General George W. Morgan, whom Sherman blamed for the defeat at Chickasaw Bayou.  Both corps had two divisions: the XIII Corps had those of Brigadier-Generals Andrew J. Smith and Peter J. Osterhaus, while the XV Corps's two were commanded by Brigadier-Generals Frederick Steele and David Stuart.  Meanwhile, Churchill had about 5,000 Confederates at Arkansas Post. These men were largely dismounted cavalrymen from Arkansas and Texas, although only about 3,000 were healthy enough to fight due to outbreaks of disease. Most were armed with short-range carbines and shotguns as opposed to longer-range rifles. Churchill's command was divided into three brigades, commanded by Colonels Dunnington, Robert Garland, and James Deshler.

Battle

January 9 and 10
McClernand's force, which consisted of about 30,000 infantry and 1,000 cavalry as well as 40 cannons, began moving upriver on January 5. In order to keep the element of surprise, the Union fleet entered the White River instead of the Arkansas, before using a connecting path between the two rivers to move back into the Arkansas. The infantrymen were moved on transport vessels, with nine warships in support. Three of the vessels were ironclads: USS Baron DeKalb, USS Louisville, and USS Cincinnati. On January 9, Churchill was informed of the approaching Union fleet. He ordered his men to defend an outer set of incomplete rifle pits. A force of Texans from Garland's brigade was sent forward as skirmishers, and the six cannons of Hart's Arkansas Battery were advanced to a position at the rifle pits, near the river. Morgan's corps was to advance directly, while Sherman's was to swing around and attack from the northwest. That same day, the Union warships bombarded the Confederate works.

On the morning of January 10, Sherman's men finished unloading around 11 a.m.  One of Morgan's brigades, under the command of Colonel Daniel W. Lindsey advanced, and took up a position on the other side of the river in order to prevent riverine reinforcements from reaching the Confederates.   As Sherman was beginning his flanking movement with Steele's division, McClernand determined that a more direct path looked promising, so Stuart's division was rerouted along it.  Steele's men, in turn, found that their flanking path was blocked by an impassable swamp, and that division had to backtrack its path anyway.  Porter's ships were also busy that morning, as the ironclads and the gunboat USS Lexington fired on Fort Hindman, while the gunboats USS Black Hawk and USS Rattler fired on the rifle pits.

Around 2 p.m., Churchill learned of Sherman's flanking maneuver and decided to withdraw his forces from the outer line, which was quickly reoccupied by Stuart's men.  One Union brigade pressed the Confederate retreat until it came under fire from Confederates in the main fort.  Morgan's men advanced as well, and the Union lines were filled out with Stuart's men on the right approaching Post Bayou, and Smith's on the left.  Confusion during the movements into these positions led to delays.  Before the delays had occurred, McClernand had told Porter that his men would be ready to attack at 2 p.m. At 5:30 p.m., McClernand told Porter that his men were finally ready, and the Union vessels advanced towards the fort to bombard it.  The three ironclads moved in to close range and were each assigned one of the heavy Confederate guns.  Lexington and Black Hawk provided supporting fire.  The shooting from the naval vessels was effective, and most of the horses within the Confederate position were killed.  Rattler was assigned to move past the fort and bombard it from the other side, but it was damaged when it fouled on a piling in the river and had to withdraw.  The Confederate batteries had been silenced, but McClernand did not attack, and it soon became too dark for an assault.  While the Confederate position had been badly damaged by the naval fire, Rattler had suffered significant damage, 17 men had become casualties on Baron DeKalb, Cincinnati had been struck 9 times, and Louisville had taken 5 hits.

Churchill was informed by Lieutenant-General Theophilus Holmes that he was expected to "hold out till help arrived or all dead".  Holmes vacillated and originally denied reinforcements, but then stated that he would send some.  A company of Texans reached the Confederate position on the night of January 10. McClernand also made a nighttime movement: a gap existed between Stuart's division and Post Bayou, and Steele's men were brought up from the rear to fill it.

January 11

On the morning of January 11, the Confederate completed improvements to improvised breastworks they had been constructing.  Deshler's left flank was exposed, so he had the 15th Texas Cavalry repositioned to make the line stronger.  Also on that morning, Steele had Brigadier-General Charles E. Hovey's brigade deployed parallel to Post Bayou and to move towards the Arkansas River to finish surrounding the Confederate force. In order to counter this threat, Deshler had men pulled from his various units to act as a skirmish line to defend the area between the flank of the 15th Texas Cavalry and Post Bayou. Hovey and Deshler's men made contact, and exchanged fire.  Learning of Hovey's movement, Churchill had the Texans who had arrived the previous night and two companies of Louisiana cavalry defend the line of Post Bayou down to the Arkansas River, and sent the 19th Arkansas Infantry and four guns of Hart's battery to support Deshler.  Around noon, another of Steele's brigades, commanded by Brigadier-General John M. Thayer, moved to Hovey's left.

That morning, Sherman had also ordered Stuart to move a brigade forward towards the fort.  Stuart sent Colonel Giles A. Smith's brigade forward in a double line, supported by Colonel Thomas Smith's brigade to Giles Smith's left rear.  Andrew Jackson Smith's division also moved forward, and Osterhaus's came up from the rear, although only one of his brigades was present, as Lindsey's was still in its blocking position and the third was in the rear guarding the Union transport vessels.  Two 20-pounder Parrott rifles were brought forward to engage one of the 9-inch columbiads in the fort, which had given Porter's ships problems the previous day.  At 1 p.m., Porter's ships moved towards the fort to again bombard it.

The three Union ironclads, supported by Lexington and two other gunboats, fired from the river, while the Union cannons on land joined in as well.  Four cannons from the Chicago Mercantile Battery contributed fire, as well.  It took only about an hour to wreck one side of the Confederate fort and knock out all three heavy guns.  The Union land artillery had orders to fire for thirty minutes after the naval bombardment opened, which was to be followed by an infantry attack three minutes after thirty-minute firing interval.  When the infantry attack began, the men were ordered to yell loudly, so that the naval vessels would hear the noise and know to shift their fire to prevent friendly fire.  Morgan could observe the progress of the gunboats, while Sherman had to judge by sound.  With the Confederates not firing in response to his cannonade, Sherman cut his cannon fire off early and sent his infantry in for the assault.

When Hovey's brigade attacked, it came under fire from Confederates on the other side of Post Bayou. To counter this threat, the 17th Missouri Infantry was aligned along Post Bayou.  Fire from Deshler's Confederates and two of Hart's pieces halted the Union attack until the 76th Ohio Infantry moved up and drove the Confederate cannon crews off.  Hovey suffered an arm wound but remained on the field.  To the left, Thayer's brigade was repulsed by the 10th Texas Infantry.  Hovey in turn had the 3d Missouri Infantry and the 31st Iowa Infantry attacked the 15th Texas Cavalry, but they were also repulsed.  Deshler sent the 19th Arkansas to support the Texans. In Stuart's sector, Giles Smith's brigade came under heavy enfilade fire from Hart's battery, and men had to crawl forward to a wooded position to fire into the battery and silence it.  T. K. Smith's brigade aligned on Giles Smith's left and two artillery batteries were brought forward.  The two brigades were then held in preparation for a general storming of the Confederate works.  To counter the attacks against his line, Deshler requested reinforcements, and was granted parts of three Texas cavalry units from Garland's brigade.

As the Union attack moved from the right to the left, Brigadier-General Stephen G. Burbridge's brigade from Morgan's corps advanced.  Confederate soldiers fired upon the brigade from a group of huts, but were cleared by an attack of the 23d Wisconsin Infantry.  The brigade was forced to halt by fire from Garland's brigade when it closed in on the Confederate position, and Colonel William Landram's brigade was brought up in support.  The two brigades fought Garland's men for an hour and a half, with Burbridge's outfit suffering about a third of the Union casualties in the battle.  At 3 p.m., Osterhaus sent his single available brigade into the fray, and the Confederate defenders were driven back.  The 120th Ohio Infantry attempted to storm the fort, but became pinned down in a ravine by Confederate fire.

The Union began a heavy artillery barrage, planning to make a general advance once it was over.  Porter had Rattler, the gunboat USS Glide, and the ram USS Monarch slip past the fort to fire into it from the rear. Around 4 or 4:30 p.m. white flags of surrender began to fly from Fort Hindman.  Garland began to hear that Churchill had ordered the surrender, although the orders did not pass through expected channels.  Historian Ed Bearss wrote that he did not believe that Churchill actually issued the order.  Churchill himself also denied ordering a capitulation.  Seeing the white flags, Sherman ordered Steele to stop fighting and moved to the Confederate position, where he ordered Garland to have his brigade stack arms.  In turn, Andrew Jackson Smith had Burbridge advance to the fort.  Burbridge went to personally plant a flag on the fort, when Confederate soldiers insisted that the fort had not surrendered until the white flags were pointed out to them.  Deshler did not believe that a surrender had occurred, and kept fighting until Union troops called a flag of truce.  During the truce, Deshler discussed with Steele and informed him that he intended to keep fighting.  Steele informed Sherman of this development, who sent Churchill to talk with Deshler.  Eventually, Deshler agreed to surrender after Sherman pointed out that his line had been swamped with Union soldiers and that some of his men had already been disarmed.

Aftermath
When the surrender was completed, 4,791 Confederates had been captured.  Partial returns indicate a further 60 Confederates killed and 80 wounded.  The Civil War Battlefield Guide place total Confederate losses as 5,004. McClernand reported capturing 17 cannons, 3,000 stands of infantry weapons, and additional equipment.  The men lost at Arkansas Post amount to about a third or fourth of the Confederates then in Arkansas.  A few hundred men had managed to escape back to Holmes.  Union losses were 1,092 men. McClernand's force had suffered 1,061 casualties, and Porter 31.

Grant has originally thought the expedition a waste of time, and had ordered McClernand back to the Vicksburg area as soon as he found out about the Arkansas Post movement. Grant later sent a disapproving letter to Halleck who gave him permission to reassign McClernand. McClernand made plans and orders for a movement against Little Rock, but this was overruled by Grant, who came down the Mississippi to take overall command of the army. Porter and Sherman were able to convince Grant of the military value of the Arkansas Post expedition. Grant later noted that the Confederate force at Arkansas Post could have proved problematic if left untended.  On January 18, or 19, the Army of the Mississippi was dissolved, and McClernand became a corps commander under Grant. Part of the battlefield is located within Arkansas Post, although  have been submerged due to river course changes and the construction of the Arkansas Post Canal.

See also

Arkansas in the American Civil War
List of American Civil War battles
Trans-Mississippi Theater of the American Civil War
Troop engagements of the American Civil War, 1863

References

Citations

Sources

External links

 
 Battle of Arkansas Post (1863) at the Historical Marker Database

1863 in Arkansas
Arkansas in the American Civil War
Arkansas Post
Battles of the American Civil War in Arkansas
Battles of the Western Theater of the American Civil War
Conflicts in 1863
History of Arkansas County, Arkansas
January 1863 events
Naval battles of the American Civil War
Riverine warfare
Union victories of the American Civil War
Vicksburg campaign